Zarifa Aziz gizi Aliyeva  (April 28, 1923 – April 15, 1985) was an Azerbaijani ophthalmologist, academician of the National Academy of Sciences of Azerbaijan and professor.

She was the wife of third President of Azerbaijan Heydar Aliyev and the mother of the fourth President of Azerbaijan, Ilham Aliyev.

Biography
Zarifa Aziz gizi Aliyeva was born in Shahtakhkty village, Sharur, in 1923. Her father was Aziz Aliyev, People's Commissar of Public Health Services of the Azerbaijan SSR and later the first secretary of the Communist party's oblast committee of Dagestan. In 1948, she married Heydar Aliyev. On October 12, 1955, their daughter Sevil was born, and on December 24, 1961, their son Ilham was born. In 1982, she lived in Moscow with her family. 

Much of Aliyeva's working life was spent at the Azerbaijan State Institute of Advanced Medical Studies. She devised and introduced new methods for treatment of ocular diseases. She was the author of 14 monographs, hundreds of research papers, and 12 rationalization proposals.

Death and legacy
In 1985, she died of cancer and was buried in Moscow. Later, in 1994, her remains were reburied in the Alley of Honor, Baku.

Postage stamps dedicated to Zarifa Aliyeva were released in 2003, 2008 and 2013.

Awards and honors
 Superior award in the sphere of ophthalmology – Premium named after M.I.Averbakh- professor of medical studies.

Selected works
 Anatomico-physiological features of the hydrodynamic system of the eye.
 Age-caused changes in eye and optic nerve passages: (Morfohistochemical researches) (in co-authorship). Baku, 1980.
 Professional pathology of eyesight (in co-authorship), 1988.
 Modern surgical methods in the treatment of epiphora.
 Lachrymal physiology.
 Sparing surgery in the treatment of the lacrimal passages.

References

1923 births
1985 deaths
Azerbaijani professors
Azerbaijani women academics
Azerbaijani women physicians
Azerbaijani ophthalmologists
First ladies of Azerbaijan
Deaths from cancer in the Soviet Union
Zarifa Aliyeva
Soviet ophthalmologists
Soviet women physicians
20th-century Azerbaijani women